The 1996 Milan–San Remo was the 87th edition of the Milan–San Remo cycle race and was held on 23 March 1996. The race started in Milan and finished in San Remo. The race was won by Gabriele Colombo of the Gewiss Playbus team.

General classification

References

1996
March 1996 sports events in Europe
1996 in road cycling
1996 in Italian sport
Milan-San Remo